Hylaeus lunicraterius is a hymenopteran and member of the Hylaeus genus, or yellow-faced bees. This species has been solely recorded at the Craters of the Moon National Monument found in Idaho, and is endemic to this location.

A holotype of H. lunicraterius was caught and preserved on August 21, 1964. This specimen is preserved in the Los Angeles County Museum entomology collection.

Life history 
Hylaeus lunicraterius has a flight season from July to August. It is believed to be a generalist forager, and has been observed foraging from Phacelia species, Eriogonum species, and members of the Compositae family, such as Ericameria nauseosa. It is known to be a pollinator of mouse buckwheat (Eriogonum nudum var. murinum).

Nesting biology 
Little is known about nesting biology of this species. The Hylaeus genus is characterised by nesting in uninhabited beetle holes and dead wood, but is suspected to utilize crevices in lava flows as well.

References 

Colletidae
Insects described in 1970
Taxa named by Roy Snelling